Eric R. Bittner  is a theoretical chemist, physicist, and distinguished professor of chemical physics at the University of Houston.

Biography 
Bittner obtained his B.S. in chemistry and in physics from Valparaiso University in 1988. From 1988 to 1994 he worked with John C. Light at the University of Chicago and obtained his Ph.D. thesis in 1994 on Quantum Theories of Energy Exchange at the Gas-Surface Interface. Subsequently, he worked at the University of Texas at Austin until 1996 as Postdoctoral Fellow of the National Science Foundation, with Peter J. Rossky as his mentor. He was visiting scholar at Stanford University from 1995 to 1997, with Hans C. Andersen as his mentor.

In 1997 he joined the University of Houston as an assistant professor of theoretical chemistry, where he became an associate professor of theoretical chemistry in 2003. In summer of 2001, he worked as visiting faculty at the Center for Non-Linear Studies at Los Alamos National Lab.

Since 2009, Bittner is John and Rebecca Moores Distinguished Professor of chemical physics at the University of Houston.

He has worked at the University of Cambridge, the École Normale Supérieure, Paris, and at Los Alamos National Lab and has collaborated, among others, with Robert E. Wyatt.

Work 
His main research interests lie with the dynamics of molecules in their excited electronic states.

Bittner and his co-workers have investigated organic semiconductors, in particular, semiconductive polymers, the modulation and tuning of their electronic dynamics due to intramolecular vibrational motions of the polymers, and investigations into phonon modes.
They have worked on energy transfer in DNA molecules using methods of molecular dynamics, time-dependent density functional theory (TD-DFT) and analytical lattice models.
They have developed a quantum hydrodynamics approach for computing the energies involved in quantum vibrations in small atomic clusters by combining the De Broglie–Bohm formulation of quantum mechanics and Baysian sampling, using this approach also to study quantum aspects of the thermodynamics of small rare gas clusters in thermal regions close to the clusters' melting point. 
Furthermore, they used supersymmetry (SUSY) quantum mechanics for computing excitation energies of quantum systems using Monte Carlo calculations.

His APS Fellowship citation reads: 
“For developing theoretical and computational descriptions of quantum dynamics in molecular systems, especially for their use in understanding the migration of energy and charge in molecular electronic excited states.”

Awards 
Bittner has received several grants and awards for his work:
2019 Distinguished Alumni Award from Valparaiso University 
2018 Leverhulme Trust Visiting Professor, Durham University
2016 Fellow of the American Physical Society, Division of Chemical Physics
2016 Fellow of the Royal Society of Chemistry
2012 Fulbright Canada Scholar
2009 John and Rebecca Moores Professorship.
2008 University of Houston Research Excellence Award
2007 to 2008 Guggenheim Fellow
2003 Wiley/International Journal of Quantum Chemistry Young Investigator Award
1999 NSF CAREER Award
1995 to 1997 NSF Postdoctoral Fellow
1994 Elizabeth R. Norton Prize for Excellence in Research in Chemistry (University of Chicago)
1988 Lumina Award (Valparaiso University)

The John and Rebecca Moores professorship was awarded to him as recognition for "outstanding work in both research and teaching". In his nomination, special emphasis was placed on his seminal work on trajectory-base methods for performing quantum mechanical calculations.

Publications 
Books
 Eric R. Bittner: Quantum Dynamics: Application in Biological and Materials Systems, CRC Press, 2009, 

Articles
, Eric R. Bittner has published over 100 scientific papers. His publications on trajectory-based methods include:
 Eric R. Bittner, Donald J. Kouri, Sean Derrickson, and Jeremy B. Maddox: Variational Quantum Hydrodynamics, in: Xavier Oriols and Jordi Mompart (eds.), Applied Bohmian Dynamics (invited review chapter), 2010, 
 Eric R. Bittner: Quantum initial value representations using approximate Bohmian trajectories, Journal of Chemical Physics, vol. 119, no. 3, 2003,  arXiv: quant-ph/0304012
 Eric R. Bittner, Donald J. Kouri: Quantum dynamics and super-symmetric quantum mechanics, in P. K. Chattaraj (ed.): Quantum Trajectories, CRC Press, 2010, 
 Jeremy B. Maddox, Eric R. Bittner  Estimating Bohm’s quantum force using Bayesian statistics , Journal of Chemical Physics 119, pp. 6465, 2003, 
 Robert E. Wyatt, Eric R. Bittner: Quantum wave packet dynamics with trajectories: Implementation with adaptive Lagrangian grids of the amplitude of the wave function, Journal of Chamical Physics, vol. 113, no. 20, 22 November 2000, 
 Andrey Preverzev and Eric R. Bittner: Hamiltonian Approach for Wavepacket Dynamics: Beyond Gaussian Wavepackets, Physics Letters A, vol. 373, pp. 2215–2218, 2009,

References

External links 
 Eric R. Bittner, Department of Chemistry , Faculty member page, Curriculum Vitae  and Eric Bittner, publications and preprints list, University of Houston
 Curriculum Vitae , University of Houston
 ResearchCrossroads
 Mendeley publications list 
 ScientificCommons publications list
 Guggenheim Fellowship announcement, Eurekalert
 Quantum clusters: finite temperature variational quantum hydrodynamics

1965 births
Living people
Theoretical chemists
20th-century American chemists
20th-century American physicists
Valparaiso University alumni
University of Chicago alumni
University of Texas at Austin people
Stanford University staff
University of Houston faculty
21st-century American physicists
21st-century American chemists
Fellows of the American Physical Society